The men's cruiserweight (86 kg/189.2 lbs) Low-Kick division at the W.A.K.O. European Championships 2004 in Budva was the third heaviest of the male Low-Kick tournaments and involved just six fighters.  Each of the matches was three rounds of two minutes each and were fought under Low-Kick kickboxing rules.

Due to the fact there were too few fighters for a tournament fit for eight, two of the participants received a bye through to the semi finals.  Goran Radović from Serbia and Montenegro won gold by defeating Russia's Alexandr Poydunov in the final by split decision.  Defeated semi finalists Umberto Lucci and Yurij Aorohin from Italy and Moldova respectively, won bronze medals.

Results
These matches ended in a split decision.

See also
List of WAKO Amateur European Championships
List of WAKO Amateur World Championships
List of male kickboxers

References

External links
 WAKO World Association of Kickboxing Organizations Official Site

W.A.K.O. European Championships 2004 (Budva)